Walter Edmund Powell (31 March 1878 – 7 July 1945) was an Australian rules footballer who played with Carlton in the Victorian Football League (VFL).

Notes

External links 

Wally Powell's profile at Blueseum

1878 births
1945 deaths
Carlton Football Club players
Australian rules footballers from Melbourne